The Campbell Playhouse may refer to:

The Campbell Playhouse  (radio series), old-time radio program starring Orson Welles
The Campbell Playhouse  (TV series), 1950s television series

See also
The Mercury Theatre on the Air, old-time radio program continued as The Campbell Playhouse